Irene J. Winter (born 1940 in New York City) is an American art historian who is an influential and pioneering scholar of ancient Near Eastern art.

Life
BA Barnard College, Anthropology, 1960; MA University of Chicago, Near Eastern Studies, 1967; PhD Columbia University, Art History and Archaeology. She has taught at Queens College, CUNY, 1971-1976, The University of Pennsylvania, 1976-1988, and Harvard University since 1988, chairing the department of Fine Arts from 1993-1996, and served on the Faculty Council, 2006-2009; retired June 2009.  Slade Professor, University of Cambridge, 1997.
She was elected a member of the American Academy of Arts and Sciences in 1999 and the American Philosophical Society in 2016.

Awards
 2009 The Barnard College Medal of Distinction
 2005 A. W. Mellon Lectures in the Fine Arts
 2003-2004 Radcliffe Institute for Advanced Study fellows
 1983 MacArthur Fellows Program

Works
 On Art in the Ancient Near East, 2 Vols. Brill Academic Publishers, 2010,

References

Further reading
 

1940 births
Living people
American art historians
Columbia Graduate School of Arts and Sciences alumni
Harvard University faculty
MacArthur Fellows
Women art historians
Members of the American Philosophical Society
American women historians
Barnard College alumni
21st-century American women
Fellows of the American Academy of Arts and Sciences